is a video game released in arcades by Nintendo in 1979. It is a Breakout clone and one of Nintendo's earliest arcade games. Some sources claim that Ikegami Tsushinki also did design work on Monkey Magic. Players control a paddle to hit the ball at a large number of blocks shaping a monkey's face. Players can also earn different numbers of points by catching blocks that fall, as well as hitting the ball in different places.

Notes

References

External links 
Monkey Magic at NinDB
Monkey Magic at Arcade History

1979 video games
Arcade video games
Arcade-only video games
Breakout clones
Nintendo games
Nintendo arcade games
Single-player video games
Video games about primates
Video games developed in Japan